Xenodochus is a genus of rust fungus in the family Phragmidiaceae, containing the following species:

 Xenodochus minor
 Xenodochus carbonarius, Schltdl., 1826 (Great Burnet Rust)

Both species parasitise members of the Rose family in the genus Sanguisorba, but the genus has a highly discontinuous distribution, with X. minor known from sub-arctic Alaska and X. carbonarius from Europe.

References

External links

Pucciniales